Hughenden  is a village in central Alberta, Canada. It is located 49 km south of Wainwright, in the Municipal District of Provost No. 52, along Highway 13.

The community takes its name from the Hughenden Manor, home of Benjamin Disraeli.

Demographics 

In the 2016 Census of Population conducted by Statistics Canada, the Village of Hughenden recorded a population of 243 living in 101 of its 117 total private dwellings, a  change from its 2011 population of 230.

The Village of Hughenden's 2012 municipal census counted a population of 258, a 0.3% decrease over its 2008 municipal census population of 266.

See also 
List of communities in Alberta
List of villages in Alberta

References

External links 

1917 establishments in Alberta
Villages in Alberta